The "Star of the East" is a 94.78-carat, pear-shaped, D-color stone of VS2 clarity grade. Its exact origin is unknown, but it likely originated from India. The origin of its name and year of discovery are also unknown. The diamond was part of the collection of the jewellery-loving Sultan of the Ottoman Empire, Abdul Hamid II. It was later acquired by Pierre Cartier, who sold it to Evalyn Walsh McLean. After McLean's death, Harry Winston purchased the diamond together with McLean's entire collection. The diamond's current whereabouts are unknown.

History
The Star of the East's exact origin is unknown, but it likely originated from one of the five groups of mines that were situated on the eastern side of the Deccan Plateau in Southern and Central India. The stone first surfaced in the collection of the Sultan Abdul Hamid. It was later acquired by Pierre C. Cartier. In 1908, Evelyn Walsh McLean purchased the stone for $120,000 from Cartier while on a honeymoon with her husband Edward Beale McLean. The Star of the East then remained in McLean's hands for about 40 years until her death. According to an article in the Southern Inspired Magazine, McLean died wearing the Star of the East and her more famous stone: the Hope Diamond. After her death, the Star of the East and the Hope Diamond were sold to Harry Winston, an American jeweler later known for donating the Hope Diamond to the Smithsonian Institution.

Winston sold the Star of the East to King Farouk of Egypt, but never received payment for it. Several years after King Farouk's overthrow in 1952, the Egyptian government recognized Winston's claim, and the stone was eventually returned to him. At a later time, the Star of the East was displayed at the Museum of Modern Art, New York, at a reception marking the 50th anniversary of Harry Winston, Inc. The Star of the East's present whereabouts are unknown.

Known changes over time

Confusion with the Ahmedabad diamond 
An article about Harry Winston appeared in the 1983 Spring issue of Gems & Gemology magazine. In the section about the Star of the East, the magazine Stated:

Since the stones are both pear-shaped, D-color, believed to be of Indian origin, similar in weight, and have some unknown whereabouts, it is easy to understand why they were confused one for another. However, the confusion was resolved in November 1995 when the real Ahmedabad was offered for sale at Christie's in Geneva, and later bought by Robert Mouawad for $4,324,554.

See also
 List of diamonds

Further reading
 Shipley, Robert M. (1949–50) Gemological Digest: History given for Star of The East, pp.  257-258 (PDF page 31-32) Gemological Institute of America, USA, Vol. 6, No. 08 (Winter 1949-50)

References

Diamonds originating in India
Individual diamonds